Colton Zimring Gordon (born December 20, 1998) is an American professional baseball pitcher in the Houston Astros organization.

Career
Gordon attended Lakewood Ranch High School in Bradenton, Florida. He played college baseball at the University of Florida, Hillsborough Community College, and the University of Central Florida (UCF). He underwent Tommy John Surgery during his senior year at UCF. Despite the injury, he was drafted by the Houston Astros in the eighth round of the 2021 Major League Baseball draft.

Gordon returned from the injury in 2022 to play for the Florida Complex League Astros, Fayetteville Woodpeckers and Asheville Tourists. After the season, he pitched in the Arizona Fall League.

In 2023, Gordon was selected to play for the Israel national baseball team in the 2023 World Baseball Classic.

References

External links

1998 births
Living people
Baseball players from St. Petersburg, Florida
Baseball pitchers
Florida Gators baseball players
Hillsborough Hawks baseball players
UCF Knights baseball players
Kenosha Kingfish players
Florida Complex League Astros players
Fayetteville Woodpeckers players
Asheville Tourists players
Surprise Saguaros players
2023 World Baseball Classic players